Letters from Three Lovers is a 1973 made-for-television drama film directed by John Erman. An ABC Movie of the Week and a sequel to The Letters (1973), the film is co-produced by Aaron Spelling, written by Ann Marcus and stars Martin Sheen, Belinda Montgomery, Robert Sterling, June Allyson, Ken Berry and Juliet Mills, among others.

Plot 
A mailman (Henry Jones) speaks about three stories of lives completely changed by letters which were temporarily lost when the mail plane crashed. The first story is of Vincent (Martin Sheen), a Vietnam war veteran, whose wife, Angie (Belinda Montgomery) works at a bar.  Vincent reveals to Angie that he has recently been fired and cannot afford marriage, nor can he invest in a garage with his friend Jesse. Even though Angie tells him that she loves him nonetheless, Vincent robs Al (James McCallion), Angie's strict boss, in a desperate rage. He is imprisoned, and Angie attempts to support him, but Vincent - ashamed - orders her not to visit him again, but he has difficulty forgetting about his fiancee. In a letter, Angie informs him that she still stands by his side, and that she was fired from the job, and has since moved away for a new job.

In the second story, set in a suburb 350 miles from Los Angeles, a wealthy older couple Joshua (Barry Sullivan) and Monica Brandon (June Allyson) do not seem invested in each other's lives anymore. The marriage suffered the sudden death of their 10-year-old son years earlier. When, one night, her husband does not show up in a restaurant in Los Angeles for dinner, Monica meets Bob Francis (Robert Sterling). They share a meal and have a great time, and end up in bed with each other. Monica and Bob promise each other to meet once a month in the same hotel, and to send a letter to the place if one cannot attend. The next month, Bob finds out that his business will send him to New York, not Los Angeles, meaning that they cannot meet. He sends a letter to the hotel, but it is delayed, leaving Monica stood up.

The final story involves middle class businessman Jack (Ken Berry), who was once a spontaneous guy, but is now criticized by colleague Sam (Lyle Waggoner) for having become a scrooge. He plans to marry a rich girl, and checks into an expensive hotel in Palm Beach to achieve his goal. Meanwhile, e secretary Donna (Ellen Weston), is invited to accompany her boss, Mr. Thompson (Dan Tobin), to Palm Beach. She is not able to come and instead sends her colleague Maggie (Juliet Mills). Work  soon requires Thompson to leave, but he allows Maggie to take full usage of his hotel room, allowing her to have a short vacation as soon as she is done filing papers. She meets Jack and enjoys his attention so much that she pretends to come from money. After several dates Jack proposes to her. She promises to give him an answer the next morning, but he has left; she assumes he's discovered she is not wealthy. Jack, meanwhile, admits to Sam that he left because he feels that he is not good enough for her. In a letter, he reveals his fraud, but assures her that he loves her.

The mailman explains that all three letters arrived a year late. Vincent, who has since been released from prison, is desperately seeking Angie, when he receives her belated letter and learns her new address. A criminal named Wilson (Logan Ramsey) has offered him money to serve as a driver in a heist, but Vincent wants to visit Angie and refuses. Wilson, however, threatens to kill him if he does participate. During the heist, Vincent calls Angie to tell her he loves her. Wilson sees him in a telephone booth and thinks that he is warning the police, so shoots and kills him. Meanwhile, Monica is considering adopting a child with Joshua, when she suddenly receives Bob's letter. They meet, but she realizes that the passion is gone. She gladly returns to Joshua, and tells him how much she loves him. Finally, Maggie receives Jack's letter and coincidentally runs into him at work the same day. Jack fears that she hates him because of the letter, but Maggie assures him that she loves him even more.

Cast
June Allyson as Monica Brandon
Ken Berry as Jack
Juliet Mills as Maggie McCauley
Belinda Montgomery as Angie Mason
Martin Sheen as Vincent Manella
Robert Sterling as Bob Francis
Barry Sullivan as Josh Brandon
Henry Jones as the mailman
Lyle Waggoner as Sam
Larry Rosenberg as Messenger
Dan Tobin as Mr. Thompson
Logan Ramsey as Wilson
Lou Frizzell as Eddie
James McCallion as Al
Ellen Weston as Donna
Kathrine Baumann as girl at pool
June Dayton as Jeanne, Bob's secretary

See also
 List of American films of 1973

References

External links

1973 television films
1973 films
1973 drama films
ABC Movie of the Week
Films set in Los Angeles
Films set in Florida
Television sequel films
Films directed by John Erman
Films produced by Aaron Spelling